Luxury was a power pop rock music band from Des Moines, Iowa that played together from 1977 – 1982. It released two 7" singles and one EP.

Luxury's single "Green Hearts" has appeared on The Declaration of Independents compilation as well as the Yellow Pills: Prefill and the Buttons: Starter Kit compilations. It was also used in the soundtrack of the movie Summerhood aka Age of Summerhood directed by Jacob Medjuck.

Luxury's single "One In A Million" also appeared on the Yellow Pills: Prefill and the Buttons: Starter Kit compilations. The single "Countdown" also appeared on the Buttons: Starter Kit compilation.

Band members
 Rick Swan – vocals, guitar
 Kerry Swan – lead vocals, guitar, keyboards
 Jeff Shotwell – guitar
 Bryn Ohme – bass
 Doug Taylor – drums, percussion
 Jim Willits – drums (1979)
 Don Papian – drums (1978)

Discography

 Stupidest Thing / What Kind of Question's That? (Angry Young Records 1978) [7" only]
 Green Hearts / One in a Million (Angry Young Records 1979) [AYR 2479] [7" only]
 EP #1 (Angry Young Records 1981) [12" only]

External links
 Luxury Page at Rate Your Music
 Luxury listing at Punk Mod Pop (French)
 Luxury's listing on the Underground Archives

Rock music groups from Iowa
American power pop groups